Folke Nilsson (23 June 1907 – 21 June 1980) was a Swedish cyclist. He competed in the individual road race event at the 1932 Summer Olympics.

References

External links
 

1907 births
1980 deaths
Swedish male cyclists
Olympic cyclists of Sweden
Cyclists at the 1932 Summer Olympics
Sportspeople from Uppsala